Hemeroby, or hemerochora is a term used in botanical and ecological sciences. It is often associated to naturalness as the complementary term, with a high degree of hemeroby equating to a high human influence on a natural environment. However, the two terms are not inversely related.

Etymology
The term is derived from the Greek hémeros and bíos.
The word hemero-, hemer- means tame, cultivated. Bios is life. Hemeroby literally means "tamed life".

Quantification

Various scales for quantifying hemeroby have been devised.

See also

Human impact on the environment
Rewilding
Ruderal species

References

Ecology terminology